Sikka may refer to:

 Sikka Regency, Indonesia
 Sikka, India
 Sikka (surname), a Punjabi surname
 Sikka Club Beirut, a defunct association football club in Lebanon